Bernhard Weiss (20 June 182714 January 1918) was a German Protestant New Testament scholar. He was the father of Johannes Weiss and the painter, Hedwig Weiss.

Biography
Weiss was born at Königsberg. After studying theology at the University of Königsberg (Albertina), Halle and Berlin, he became professor extraordinarius at Königsberg in 1852, and afterwards professor ordinarius at Kiel and Berlin. In 1880 he was made superior consistorial councillor of the Evangelical State Church of Prussia's older Provinces.

Literary production
An opponent of the Tübingen School, he published a number of important works, which became well known to students in Great Britain and America. He was also the reviser of commentaries on the New Testament in the series of H.A.W. Meyer: he wrote the commentaries on Matthew (the 9th ed., 1897), Mark and Luke (the 9th ed., 1901), John (the 9th ed., 1902), Romans (the 9th ed., 1899), the Epistles to Timothy and Titus (the 7th ed., 1902), Hebrews (the 6th ed., 1897), and the Epistles of John (the 6th ed., 1900).

Weiss also established a new text of the Greek New Testament, which was utilized by Eberhard Nestle for his Novum Testamentum Graece.

His other works include:
Lehrbuch der biblischen Theologie des Neuen Testaments (1868, 9th ed., 1903; Eng. trans., 1883)
Des Leben Jesu (1882, 4th ed. 1902; Eng. trans., 1883)
Lehrbuch der Einleitung in des Neue Testament (1886; 3rd ed., 1897; Eng. trans. 1888)
Das Neue Testament: Berichtigter Text (3 vols, 1902)
Die Quellen des Lukasevangeliums (1907)

References

External links
Bernhard Weiss Bibliography

1827 births
1918 deaths
People from the Province of Prussia
19th-century German Protestant theologians
German biblical scholars
New Testament scholars
University of Königsberg alumni
Martin Luther University of Halle-Wittenberg alumni
Humboldt University of Berlin alumni
Academic staff of the University of Königsberg
Academic staff of the Humboldt University of Berlin
19th-century German male writers
German male non-fiction writers